Philip Sydney Short (born 1955) is an Australian botanist.

Some published names 
Actinobole oldfieldiana P.S.Short, Muelleria 6(1-2): 20 (1985).             

Allittia P.S.Short, Muelleria 20: 54 (2004).  

Angianthus conocephalus (J.M.Black) P.S.Short, Muelleria 5(2): 167 (1983).  

Asteridea morawana P.S.Short, Austral. Syst. Bot. 13(5): 741 (2000)     

Brachyscome gilesii P.S.Short, J. Adelaide Bot. Gard. 28(1): 100 (2014).

Hullsia argillicola  Muelleria 20: 58 (2004)

Some publications

Books

Articles

(incomplete)

See also 
:Category:Taxa named by Philip Sydney Short

References 

20th-century Australian botanists
Flinders University alumni
1955 births
Living people
21st-century Australian botanists